Endeavour Mining is a multinational mining company that owns and operates gold mines in Côte d'Ivoire, Burkina Faso and Senegal. The company is headquartered in London, England, and has cross listed on the London Stock Exchange in the United Kingdom, the Toronto Stock Exchange in Canada, and Over-The-Counter in the United States. It is a constituent of the FTSE 100 Index.

History
The company, established by a team led by Neil Woodyer as Endeavour Financial in 1988, diversified from mining finance to mining operations in the early 21st century.

It acquired Etruscan Resources (including the Agbaou mine in Côte d'Ivoire) in June 2010.

Endeavor announced in June 2017 that it would purchase Avnel Gold Mining Limited for C$159 million. Avnel held an 80% interest in the Kalana Gold project in Mali and exploration permits in the surrounding area.

Woodyer stood down as CEO and was replaced by Sébastien de Montessus in May 2016.

In July 2020, the company acquired Semafo for its Mana and Boungou gold mines in Burkina Faso.

In February 2021, the company acquired Teranga Gold Corporation for its Sabodala-Massawa gold mine in Senegal and its Wahgnion gold mine in Burkina Faso.

The company was subject to an initial public offering on the London Stock Exchange in June 2021.

References

Companies based in London
Companies listed on the London Stock Exchange
Companies listed on the Toronto Stock Exchange
Companies traded over-the-counter in the United States
Gold mining companies of the United Kingdom
Non-renewable resource companies established in 1988
1988 establishments in England